Antonia Moreno Morales (born 7 June 1973), better known as Toñi Moreno, is a Spanish television journalist and presenter.

Biography
Toñi Moreno was born in El Prat de Llobregat, when her father worked at SEAT, but at age 8 her family moved to Cádiz. She later studied law there, although her vocation was journalism. In 1985, at age 12, Moreno began her radio career on the station Radio Sanlúcar. At age 14, she left the world of voiceover to begin working at Telesanlúcar, the local television station in Sanlúcar de Barrameda. There she made her on-air debut. Later she joined Canal Sur, where she was a reporter for the program . After her departure for private television, on Antena 3 she hosted the reality show , coordinated the morning magazine Cada día, and worked as a reporter. On Cuatro, she headed the show 1 Equipo.

After years of success on the Andalusian station Canal Sur, Televisión Española (TVE) signed her to host , a program of solidarity and citizen participation – the national version of Tiene arreglo. She presented this from 26 August 2013 to 27 June 2014 on La 1. With the start of the new television season on 15 September, she returned to the same channel with another afternoon program called  that succeeded the canceled Entre todos. However, two months later, it would be removed from the programming schedule due to low ratings. In June 2015, Moreno began working on the Canal Sur program Los descendientes, which enjoyed critical and public success. Since January 2017, she has also hosted , a magazine that tries to empower people who show positive values in everyday situations.

In April 2017 she returned to Antena 3 to present a set of interviews entitled . While this program was still on the air, Telecinco announced signing her to host , a weekend evening magazine. She simultaneously presents this with Gente maravillosa on Canal Sur.

On 20 October 2018, the Mediaset leadership decided to remove  from Mujeres y Hombres y Viceversa, to be replaced by Moreno on 5 November. In this way, García would come to present Viva la vida.

Controversy
In February and March 2014, Moreno was the subject of controversy when her salary of 7,000 euros per week was made public, while almost simultaneously she made interjections during the intervention of a guest on her program who claimed to have suffered emotional abuse from an ex-partner. This culminated with Moreno clarifying that she does not believe someone should denounce abuse publicly if they have not previously reported it to the police. She also added assertions and expressions that came to be described in various media as "out of tune and place." Her salary drew the attention of a viewer who called the program live, directly asking the presenter to donate "at least 400 of the 1,400 euros she earns per program" to aid those affected. Moreno refused, saying that she was doing her job, which was to try to get the person who was affected to get enough calls to solve their problem.

Personal life
Toñi Moreno was romantically linked to journalist  by the newspaper Vozpópuli in 2016, though she has repeatedly refused to discuss her private life with the media.

Awards
 2010: Gold Insignia of Sanlúcar de Barrameda
 2011:  Award for Best Current Autonomous Community Program for 75 minutos

Television programs

References

External links
 
 

1973 births
Living people
People from El Prat de Llobregat
Spanish television journalists
Spanish television presenters
Spanish women journalists